Fly Play hf. (styled as PLAY) is an Icelandic low-cost airline headquartered in the country's capital of Reykjavík. It operates a fleet of Airbus A320neo family aircraft with a hub at Keflavík International Airport.

History
In July 2019, two former WOW air executives, Arnar Már Magnússon and Sveinn Ingi Steinþórsson announced the formation of a new airline, tentatively named WAB air ("We Are Back"). Avianta Capital, an Irish investment fund owned by Aislinn Whittley-Ryan (daughter of Michael Kell Ryan, one of the founders of Ryanair) held a 75% stake; the remainder was held by Neo, a company founded by Magnússon and Steinþórsson. The company aimed to operate six aircraft to 14 destinations across Europe and the US, with a target of one million passengers in the first year. The new company applied for an air operator's certificate (AOC) from the Icelandic Transport Authority.

In November 2019, WAB air rebranded as PLAY, and the hiring of operating staff was initiated. The airline announced that it would lease Airbus A321s configured with 200 passenger seats, and would start flights with two aircraft to six European destinations in the winter of 2019–2020. The airline's livery was also planned to be red. By late 2019, Play planned to initially serve six destinations in Europe, consisting of Alicante, Tenerife, London, Paris, Copenhagen and Berlin. There were plans to introduce flights to four North American destinations in the spring of 2020.
Play originally planned to start operations with two Airbus A321 aircraft configured for 200 passenger seats and add four more aircraft by the summer of 2020. By November 2020, the company had received a landing permit for only three airports, consisting of London Stansted Airport, Gatwick Airport and Dublin Airport.

In April 2021, it was announced that Play had completed a pre-IPO private placement round with a total transaction size of six billion Icelandic króna (US $47 million) in new equity managed by Arctica Finance. Participating investors included Icelandic investment company Stodir and two Icelandic pension funds. It was also confirmed that Birgir Jónsson would replace Arnar Már Magnússon as CEO. In May 2021, the airline announced the registration of its AOC, as well as the acquisition of its first aircraft, an Airbus A321neo. Soon after, the airline began ticket sales for its first flights, the operations of which launched with its inaugural flight from Keflavík International Airport to London Stansted Airport on 24 June 2021. On the same day as its maiden flight, Play launched an initial public offering (IPO), seeking to raise at least 3.9–4.3 billion Icelandic króna (US $32 to 35 million), after which its shares would be traded on Nasdaq First North Growth Market Iceland. The IPO concluded on 25 June 2021 with an eight-fold oversubscription in the offering, with total subscriptions received for 33.8 billion Icelandic króna (US $274 million).

In August 2021, Play applied to the United States Department of Transportation for the operation of flights between Keflavík and the US east coast starting in the summer of 2022. Its application was subsequently approved, and the airline on 16 December 2021 announced its first services to the United States with flights to Baltimore and Boston, launching in April and May 2022 respectively. In January 2023, Play announced it would launch its first destination in Canada, with flights between Keflavík and John C. Munro Hamilton International Airport in Ontario, to begin in June 2023.

Destinations

Play operates to destinations in Europe and North America from its hub at Keflavík International Airport.

Fleet

, Play operates an all-Airbus fleet composed of the following aircraft:

Fleet development
Play's initial fleet consisted of three Airbus A321neo aircraft, all of which were formerly operated by defunct Mexican airline Interjet. In September 2021, the airline announced its first fleet expansion with orders for three Airbus A320neos and a fourth A321neo, adding to its existing fleet of three A321neos, with the aircraft to be delivered between late 2022 and early 2023. The airline also signed a letter of intent in August to receive two A320neos by early 2022, prior to any of the other aircraft that were already on order, with the agreement subsequently signed as a firm order in November 2021. In early 2022, Play specified that an Airbus A321neo it was due to receive in anticipation of its recently announced Orlando route would be the A321LR variant, for delivery during May 2022, and that it planned to operate a total of ten aircraft by early 2023. In May 2022, Play decided to halt delivery of its Airbus A321LR and cancel the planned Orlando route due to rising fuel costs. The airline instead replaced the A321LR with an A320neo, thereby planning to operate a fleet of three A320neos and three A321neos for summer 2022. In early 2023, the airline's A321neos began seating reconfigurations to increase their capacity from 192 to 214.

See also
List of airlines of Iceland

References

External links

Airlines of Iceland
Airlines established in 2019
Icelandic brands
Companies based in Reykjavík
2019 establishments in Iceland
Companies listed on Nasdaq Iceland